Stephen Bier, formerly known by his stage name Madonna Wayne Gacy and by the nickname Pogo, is an American musician who was the keyboard player for Marilyn Manson from 1989 to 2007. His stage name came from the names of the singer Madonna and the serial killer John Wayne Gacy.

Career
Bier attended college for six years and sought a job at NASA but decided he wanted to be in a band with Brian Warner.  
He joined Marilyn Manson in late 1989 as a live prop actor after Zsa Zsa Speck left the band. Bier 
is responsible for much of the Qabalistic and numerological meanings behind Manson's albums. He did not contribute to Manson's album Eat Me, Drink Me, having been replaced by Chris Vrenna.

On August 2, 2007, it was reported that Bier filed a lawsuit against Manson for unpaid "partnership proceeds". Bier claims Manson spent the band's earnings on "sick and disturbing purchases of Nazi memorabilia and taxidermy (including the skeleton of a young Chinese girl)" and on various other luxurious items. Bier claimed that Manson "devised a campaign to drive Bier out of the band and rob him of his entitlement".

On December 19, 2007, Manson filed a counter suit against Bier, accusing him of breach of contract. According to metalunderground.com, the lawsuit was settled for a sum far less than what was originally sought by Bier with the total being $380,000.  $175,000 was paid out by Marilyn Manson while the rest was ordered to be paid by Stephen Bier's former business managers.

Discography
 Portrait of an American Family (Marilyn Manson, 1994)
 "The Hearts Filthy Lesson" single (US) (David Bowie, 1995) (uncredited)
 Smells Like Children (Marilyn Manson, 1995)
 Antichrist Superstar (Marilyn Manson, 1996)
 Remix & Repent (Marilyn Manson, 1997)
 Lost Highway Soundtrack - "Apple of Sodom" (uncredited, 1997)
 Mechanical Animals (Marilyn Manson, 1998)
 Dead Man on Campus Soundtrack (Marilyn Manson's cover of David Bowie's "Golden Years", 1999)
 Detroit Rock City (Marilyn Manson's cover of AC/DC's "Highway to Hell", 1999)
 The Last Tour on Earth (Marilyn Manson, 1999)
 Holy Wood (In the Shadow of the Valley of Death) (Marilyn Manson, 2000)
 Guns, God and Government (Marilyn Manson, 2000)
 The Golden Age of Grotesque (Marilyn Manson, 2003)
 Lest We Forget: The Best Of (Marilyn Manson, 2004)
 Lost & Found (Marilyn Manson, 2008)

Filmography
 Marilyn Manson: Dead to the World (1998)
 Marilyn Manson: Coma White (1999)
 Doppelherz (2003)
 Speed Dragon (2013) (Bones)

References

21st-century American keyboardists
American heavy metal keyboardists
Marilyn Manson (band) members
Living people
American rock keyboardists
Alternative rock keyboardists
American industrial musicians
20th-century American keyboardists
Industrial metal musicians
Year of birth missing (living people)